The stylomastoid foramen is a foramen between the styloid and mastoid processes of the temporal bone of the skull. It is the termination of the facial canal, and transmits the facial nerve, and stylomastoid artery. Facial nerve inflammation in the stylomastoid foramen may cause Bell's palsy.

Structure 
The stylomastoid foramen is between the styloid and mastoid processes of the temporal bone. The average distance between the opening of the stylomastoid foramen and the styloid process is around 0.7 mm or 0.8 mm in adults, but may decrease to around 0.2 mm during aging.

The stylomastoid foramen transmits the facial nerve, and the stylomastoid artery. These 2 structures lie directly next to each other.

Clinical significance 

Bell's palsy can result from inflammation of the facial nerve where it leaves the skull at the stylomastoid foramen. Patients with Bell's palsy appear with facial drooping on the affected side.

Additional images

References

External links 
 
 
 
 
 Diagram at patientsforum.com

Foramina of the skull